Tolpia mons is a moth of the family Erebidae first described by Michael Fibiger in 2010. It is known from central Java.

The wingspan is about 13 mm. The forewing is light brown. All transverse lines are brown, indistinct and all with a black costal spot. The terminal line is indicated by black interneural dots. The hindwing is greyish brown and the underside is unicolorous brown.

References

Micronoctuini
Taxa named by Michael Fibiger
Moths described in 2010